Chaudhari Shirish Madhukarrao is an Indian politician from Indian National Congress who is serving as Member of 14th Maharashtra Legislative Assembly from Raver Assembly constituency. In 2019 Maharashtra Legislative Assembly election, he won with margin of 15,609 votes.

References 

Indian National Congress politicians from Maharashtra
Year of birth missing (living people)
Living people
Maharashtra MLAs 2019–2024

People from Jalgaon district